OF Nea Ionia is a Greek handball club, based in Nea Ionia, Athens. It was founded in 1926. The club dominates in women handball, winning the most of the last championships and cups. The team's colours are cyan and white.

History
OF Nea Ionia was founded in 1926 by refugees from Asia Minor who had been settled in Nea Ionia. The club stopped its action its during Second World War and refounded in 1947. At those years the club had notable football team and other teams in various sports. The football team obligatorily merged with other local teams during Greek military junta. The women handball team, which is the most successful team of the club was founded in 1984. So far it won four championships and four cups. OF Nea Ionia won the champion and the cup's of season 2014-15. It is also won the championship of current season.

Current squad
As of 31 May 2015

European record

Titles
Greek Women's Handball Championship 
Winner: 5 (2014, 2015, 2016, 2017, 2018)
Greek Women's Handball Cup
Winner: 5 (2011, 2013, 2015, 2017, 2018)

References

External links
Official Page 

Greek handball clubs
Handball clubs established in 1926
1926 establishments in Greece
Sport in Attica